The 1962 NAIA Soccer Championship was the  fourth annual tournament held by the NAIA to determine the national champion of men's college soccer among its members in the United States.

East Stroudsburg State defeated Pratt in the final, 4–0, to win their first NAIA national title. 

The final was played at Earlham College in Richmond, Indiana.

Bracket

See also  
 1962 NCAA Soccer Championship

References 

NAIA championships
NAIA
NAIA
1962 in sports in Pennsylvania